Geron is a genus of bee flies (insects in the family Bombyliidae). There are at least 180 described species in Geron.

See also
 List of Geron species

References

Further reading

External links

 

Bombyliidae genera
Articles created by Qbugbot